Jonathan Edwards (born December 25, 1944), professionally known as John Edwards, is an American soul singer who had a moderately successful solo career before becoming lead singer of The Spinners between 1977 and 2000.

Biography
Born in St Louis, Missouri, Edwards began his musical career by singing in clubs while stationed in Germany when in the US Army.  After returning to live in Duluth, Georgia, he appeared on bills with Wilson Pickett, and James and Bobby Purify, before moving to Chicago in the late 1960s.  There he met Curtis Mayfield, who introduced Edwards to producer Jo Armstead at Weis Records.  He recorded several singles for the label before moving to Bell Records in 1972, and then to the Atlanta-based Aware label the following year.  Produced by Floyd Smith, Edwards first achieved chart success when "Stop This Merry-Go-Round" reached number 45 on the Billboard R&B chart in 1973.  He followed it up with "Messing Up A Good Thing" and a self-titled album, and then his most successful record, "Careful Man", produced by Smith and written by Jimmy Lewis, which reached number 8 on the R&B chart in 1974.  It was followed by "Vanishing Love", which also made the R&B chart.

After the record company went out of business, Edwards did some shows with the Spinners, but also maintained a solo career on the Cotillion label, achieving two more R&B chart entries with "Baby, Hold On to Me" (1976) and ""Nobody But You" (1977).  He then decided to join the Spinners on a full-time basis, and replaced Philippé Wynne as the group's lead singer in 1977.  He featured as the main vocalist on their later hit singles including "Working My Way Back to You", produced by Michael Zager, which became one of the group's biggest hits, reaching number 2 on the Hot 100 in early 1980, and number 1 on the UK singles chart. He also sang lead on their 1980 remake of "Cupid", which hit #4 on both the US and UK Pop Charts, and #5 on the US R&B Chart.

Edwards remained with the Spinners until 2000, when he was incapacitated by a debilitating stroke, and was forced to retire.

References

1944 births
Living people
Musicians from St. Louis
Singers from Missouri
20th-century African-American male singers